Karel Farský (26 July 1880, in Škodějov, Semily District, Bohemia – 12 June 1927, in Prague) was a Czech Roman Catholic priest, and later founder and first patriarch (1920) of the Czechoslovak Hussite Church. He was Bishop of the West Bohemia (Prague) Diocese of the Czechoslovak Church from 1923 when he became the first patriarch of the church keeping both titles of patriarch and bishop until his death in 1927. he was succeeded by Gustav Adolf Procházka who took office in 1928.

Notes

References
 Nĕmec, Ludvík (1975) The Czechoslovak Heresy and Schism: the emergence of a national Czechoslovak church American Philosophical Society, Philadelphia, 
 Tonzar, David (2002) Vznik a vývoj novodobé husitské teologie a Církev československá husitska Karolinum, Prague,  in Czech
 Urban, Rudolf (1973) Die tschechoslowakische hussitische Kirche J.G. Herder-Institut, Marburg/Lahn, in German
This article is based in part on material from the Czech Wikipedia.

1880 births
1927 deaths
People from Semily District
People from the Kingdom of Bohemia
20th-century Czech Roman Catholic priests
Czechoslovak Hussite Church bishops
20th-century archbishops
Czechoslovak Roman Catholic priests
Former Roman Catholics